Pakistan has several official national symbols including a flag, an emblem, an anthem, a memorial tower as well as several national heroes. The symbols were adopted at various stages in the existence of Pakistan and there are various rules and regulations governing their definition or use. The oldest symbol is the Lahore Resolution, adopted by the All India Muslim League on 23 March 1940, and which presented the official demand for the creation of a separate country for the Muslims of India. The Minar-e-Pakistan memorial tower which was built in 1968 on the site where the Lahore Resolution was passed. The national flag was adopted just before independence was achieved on 14 August 1947. The national anthem and the state emblem were each adopted in 1954. There are also several other symbols including the national animal, bird, flower and tree.

Minar-e-Pakistan 

The Lahore Resolution (Qarardad-e-Lahore), also known as the Pakistan Resolution, was a formal political statement adopted by the All India Muslim League at the occasion of its three-day general session on 22–24 March 1940 at Minto Park (now Iqbal Park), Lahore. The resolution called for greater Muslim autonomy in British India and has been largely interpreted as a demand for a separate Muslim state. The idea of separate state for Indian Muslims was first suggested by Muhammad Iqbal in 1930 and the name of Pakistan was proposed by Choudhary Rahmat Ali in his Pakistan Declaration pamphlet in 1933. Initially, Muhammad Ali Jinnah and other leaders were in favour of Hindu-Muslim unity, but the volatile political climate and religious hostilities of the 1930s made the idea more appealing.
In his speech, Jinnah criticised the Indian National Congress and the nationalist Muslims, and espoused the Two-Nation Theory and the reasons for the demand for separate Muslim homelands. Sir Sikandar Hayat Khan, the Chief Minister of the Punjab, drafted the original resolution, but that was not fully acceptable to all the Working Committee, so extensive redrafting followed, by the Subject Committee of the Muslim League. The text is ambiguous in accepting the concept of various Muslim 'zones' within a "United India" due to communal concerns and it does not clearly recommend the creation of a separate, fully independent Muslim state. The resolution was moved in the general session by A.K. Fazlul Huq, Chief Minister of Bengal and was supported seconded by several leaders. The principle text of the Lahore Resolution was passed on 24 March 1940. In 1941 it became part of the Muslim League's constitution. By 1946, it formed the basis for the struggle of the Muslim League for a separate Muslim state. The statement declared:

The Minar-e-Pakistan (Mīnār-ĕ Pākistān) which is the national tower of Pakistan also known as Tower of Pakistan is a 60 metre tall concrete minaret in Iqbal Park in Lahore. The Minar was built on the site where the Muslim League passed the Lahore Resolution, demanding the creation of Pakistan. Pakistan now celebrates this day as a national holiday each year under the name of Pakistan Day which is also the day in 1956 when the country became the first Islamic Republic in the world. It was designed by Muhammad Wali Ullah Khan and built by Mian Abdul Khaliq Company. The base of the tower is raised about 4 metres from the ground. The next 13 metres form a sculpted, flower-like base and from this point, the Minar tapers as it rises. The base platform is shaped like a five-pointed star and it encloses crescent-shaped pools. It is constructed of reinforced concrete, with the floors and walls rendered in stone and marble.

National flag 

The national flag was designed by Muhammad Ali Jinnah, the founder of Pakistan, and was based on the original flag of the Muslim League. It was adopted by the Constituent Assembly on 11 August 1947, just days before independence. The flag is referred to in the national anthem as Parcham-e-Sitāra-o-Hilāl in Urdu (lit. Flag of the Crescent and Star). The flag comprises a dark green field, representing the Muslim majority of Pakistan, with a vertical white stripe in the hoist, representing religious minorities. In the centre is a white crescent moon, representing progress, and a white five-pointed star, representing light and knowledge. The flag symbolizes Pakistan's commitment to Islam, the Islamic world and the rights of religious minorities. The flag is flown on several important days of the year including Republic Day and Independence Day. The flag is also flown on the residences and motor vehicles of many public officials including the President and the Prime Minister.

National anthem 

The national anthem of Pakistan or Qaumī Tarāna, is played during any event involving the hoisting of the flag, for example Resolutions Day (23 March) and Independence Day (14 August). The Constituent Assembly had not adopted a national anthem by the time Pakistan became independent, so when the flag was hoisted at the independence ceremony it was accompanied by the song, "Pakistan Zindabad, Azadi Paendabad". Muhammad Ali Jinnah asked a Lahore-based Hindu writer, Jagan Nath Azad, to write a national anthem for Pakistan. Jinnah may have done this to promote a more secular idealism for Pakistan. The anthem written by Azad was quickly approved by Jinnah, and it was played on Radio Pakistan. Azad's work remained as Pakistan's national anthem for about eighteen months.

A National Anthem Committee was formed in 1948, but it had difficulty finding suitable music and lyrics. The impending state visit of the Shah of Iran in 1950, resulted in the hasty adoption of a three stanza composition by Ahmed Ghulamali Chagla. Initially it was performed without lyrics for the Prime Minister Liaquat Ali Khan on 10 August 1950 and was approved for playing during the visit of the Shah. However, the anthem was not officially adopted until August 1954. The National Anthem Committee eventually approved lyrics written by Abu-Al-Asar Hafeez Jullandhuri and the new national anthem was first played properly on Radio Pakistan on 13 August 1954. Official approval was announced by the Ministry of Information and Broadcasting on 16 August 1954 followed by a performance of the national anthem in 1955 involving eleven major singers of Pakistan including Ahmad Rushdi.

State emblem 

The State Emblem was adopted in 1954 and symbolizes Pakistan's ideological foundation, the basis of its economy, its cultural heritage and its guiding principles. The four components of the emblem are a crescent and star crest above a shield, which is surrounded by a wreath, below which is a scroll. The crest and the green colour of the emblem are traditional symbols of Islam. The quartered shield in the centre shows cotton, wheat, tea and jute, which were the major crops of Pakistan at independence and signify the agricultural base of the economy. The floral wreath, surrounding the shield, represents the floral designs used in traditional Mughal art and emphasizes the cultural heritage of Pakistan.

Motto 

The scroll supporting the shield contains Muhammad Ali Jinnah's motto in Urdu, which reads from right to left: "Iman, Ittehad, Nazm o Zabt" translated as "Faith, Unity, Discipline" and are intended as the guiding principles for Pakistan.

List of other national symbols

References

External links 
 The Government of Pakistan
 Ministry of Information and Broadcasting
 Ministry of Culture, Sports and Youth Affairs
 Ministry of National Heritage and Integration

 
Pakistani culture
Pakistan